Tilton is an unincorporated community in Fleming County, Kentucky, in the United States.

History
Tilton was incorporated in 1854. A post office was established at Tilton in 1855, and remained in operation until it was discontinued in 1905.

References

Unincorporated communities in Fleming County, Kentucky
Unincorporated communities in Kentucky